Marisabel Cabrera (born December 12, 1975) is an American lawyer and politician from the state of Wisconsin. She serves in the Wisconsin State Assembly, representing the south side of Milwaukee. She is a member of the Democratic Party.

Biography

Born and raised in Milwaukee's south side, Cabrera graduated from Nathan Hale High School in 1993.  She earned her bachelor's degree from the University of Wisconsin–Madison, in Spanish and Latin American Iberian Studies, and earned her J.D. from Michigan State University College of Law in 2002.  She was admitted to the state bars of Wisconsin and Florida, and worked as an immigration attorney in private practice and with the non-profit group Voces de la Frontera ("Voices from the Border").  She is the former chair of the Milwaukee Police and Fire Commission and the Democratic Party of Wisconsin Latino Caucus.  For her work with the Latino Caucus, she was recognized by the Democratic Party of Milwaukee County with the 2016 Rising Star Award.

In 2018, she successfully challenged incumbent Assemblymember Josh Zepnick in a Democratic primary election, after losing an earlier attempt in 2016.  She was elected without opposition in the 2018 general election.  In 2017, Zepnick had been accused of sexually harassing two female colleagues; he had been stripped of his committee assignments and Assembly privileges but refused to resign.

In the Assembly, Cabrera serves on the committees on the Judiciary, International Affairs and Commerce, Small Business Development, Consumer Protection, Constitution and Ethics, and State Affairs.

Electoral history

| colspan="6" style="text-align:center;background-color: #e9e9e9;"| Primary Election, August 9, 2016

| colspan="6" style="text-align:center;background-color: #e9e9e9;"| Primary Election, August 14, 2018

| colspan="6" style="text-align:center;background-color: #e9e9e9;"| General Election, November 6, 2018

References

External links

Voces de la Frontera

1975 births
Living people
Democratic Party members of the Wisconsin State Assembly
Women state legislators in Wisconsin
Politicians from Milwaukee
Lawyers from Milwaukee
Florida lawyers
University of Wisconsin–Madison College of Letters and Science alumni
Michigan State University College of Law alumni
21st-century American women politicians
LGBT state legislators in Wisconsin
LGBT people from Wisconsin
Bisexual politicians
Bisexual women
21st-century American politicians
Hispanic and Latino American state legislators in Wisconsin